The following is a list of Sites of Special Scientific Interest in the Angus and Dundee Area of Search.  For other areas, see List of SSSIs by Area of Search.

 Auchterhouse Hill
 Balloch Moss
 Balshando Bog
 Barry Links
 Blacklaw Hill Mire
 Caenlochan
 Carrot Hill Meadow
 Craigs of Lundie and Ardgarth Loch
 Crossbog Pinewood
 Den of Airlie
 Den of Fowlis
 Den of Ogil
 Dilty Moss
 Dryleys Brick Pit
 Dun's Dish
 Easthaven
 Elliot Links
 Fafernie
 Forest Muir
 Gagie Marsh
 Gannochy Gorge
 Garbh Choire
 Glen Callater
 Inner Tay Estuary
 Lairds Loch
 Little Ballo
 Loch Brandy
 Loch of Kinnordy
 Loch of Lintrathen
 Lochindores
 Long Loch of Lundie
 Monifieth Bay
 Montrose Basin
 North Esk and West Water Palaeochannels
 Red Craig
 Redmyre
 Rescobie and Balgavies Lochs
 Restenneth Moss
 Rickle Craig - Scurdie Ness
 Rossie Moor
 Round Loch of Lundie
 St Cyrus and Kinnaber Links
 Turin Hill
 Whitehouse Den
 Whiting Ness - Ethie Haven Coast

 
Angus and Dundee
SSSI